Sweet Jam or Confituur is a Flemish film, directed by Lieven Debrauwer and released on 20 October 2004.

Cast 

The film stars Marilou Mermans as Emma, Rik Van Uffelen as Tuur, Viviane de Muynck as Gerda, Chris Lomme as Josée and Jasperina de Jong as Odette.

Awards 

At the Joseph Plateau Awards in 2004, Sweet Jam received two nominations: Best Belgian Actress for de Muynck and Best Belgian Director for Debrauwer. Neither de Muynck nor Debrauwer won, being beaten by Marie Vinck (for her performance in De Kus) and Frédéric Fonteyne (for Gilles' Wife) respectively.

References

External links 

2004 films
Belgian comedy-drama films
2000s Dutch-language films